Transmembrane protein 82 (TMEM82) is a protein encoded by the TMEM82 gene in humans.

Gene 
The TMEM82 gene is found on chromosome 1 (1p36.21) from 15,742,499 to 15,747,982, spanning 5,484 base pairs. It is found on the plus strand and has 6 exons and 5 introns. The SLC25A34 gene is found on TMEM82's antisense strand and ecodes for a mitochondrial carrier protein.

There are a few known genetic variants which alter the molecular phenotype. One is an intergenic mutation that results in a protein product that is associated with Troponin-T. A SNP (T/C, missense) with an allele frequency of about 4% results in a protein product that is associated with Insulin-Like Growth Factor Binding Protein 3, although with a very small effect size.

mRNA 

There human mRNA transcript for TMEM82, of which there are no isoforms, has 1,443 nucleotides which encodes a 343 amino acid long precursor protein of about 37kDa including 8 predicted transmembrane domains and 1 disordered region.

Expression 
In humans, the RNA transcript is expressed highly in the kidney, liver, small intestine, and duodenum and is also expressed in the colon and stomach. Single cell RNA-seq data indicate several tissue specific cell types with enhanced TMEM82 expression in the stomach, colon, kidney, and liver: these cell types include parietal cells, chief cells, gastric mucous cells, mitotic cells, and gastric enteroendochrine cells in the stomach, colon enterocytes in the colon, proximal tubular cells in the kidney, and hepatocytes in the liver. During fetal development it is also expressed in adrenal and heart tissues and becomes highly expressed in the small intestine by 15 weeks of gestation. Its expression cluster is similar to those for genes involved in lipid metabolism. There are several similar mouse polyclonal antibodies, some rabbit polyclonal antibodies, and a couple monoclonal options for available for the TMEM82 protein but with limited evidence for efficacy.

Protein 

TMEM82 is listed as pfam15816 for conserved protein domains and is the only member of the superfamily cl24398. TMEM82 is predicted to be an endoplasmic reticulum transmembrane protein. The theoretical isoelectric point of human TMEM82 is 8.57 and it is compositionally 23% leucine.

Post-translational modifications 
Predicted PTMs of human TMEM82 include phosphorylation, a glycosaminoglcan attatchment site, and  N-myristoylation.

Function 
Predicted interaction partners include  APOA2 and CYP4F2. TMEM82 has been found to coexpress with proteins involved in lipids, hormones, and xenobiotic and alcohol metabolic pathways; as such, it is hypothesized to function in metabolism.

Homologs 

Orthologs of the TMEM82 gene have been identified in 442 organisms including in the chimpanzee, Rhesus monkey, dog, cow, mouse, chicken, zebrafish, and frog and is highly conserved in mammals. TMEM82 is not found in plants or fungi. There are no paralogs of TMEM82 in humans. The end of TMEM82 encompassing its disordered region is the least evolutionarilty constrained relative to the rest of the protein. The following table lists some orthologs and their attributes of TMEM82.

Clinical significance 
Expression of TMEM82 is dysregulated in hepatocellular carcinoma. TMEM82 is present in the interaction profile of kidney renal cell carcinoma and is a favorable prognostic marker in renal cancer.TMEM82 has enhanced RNA expression in liver and renal cancer but was not correlated with the overall survival of patients with colorectal cancer. A 65.7 kbp long microduplication has been found in patients with congenital lower urinary tract obstruction at the genomic location of TMEM82 gene; the microduplication affects TMEM82 and the other genes located there: FBLIM1, PLEKHM2, SLC25A34, SLC25A34-AS1, . TMEM82 is significantly upregulated in glomeruli and predicted to have estrogen response elements.

References